Clarice di Piero de' Medici (1489–1528) was the daughter of Piero di Lorenzo de' Medici and Alfonsina Orsini.

Born in Florence, she was the granddaughter of Lorenzo de' Medici, niece of Pope Leo X and sister to Lorenzo II de' Medici.  After her brother's premature death in 1519, she educated his daughter Catherine, the future Queen of France.

In 1508 she married Filippo Strozzi the Younger and moved to Rome. Filippo and Clarice had ten children:
Piero Strozzi (about 1510 - 21 June 1558), condottiero and Marshal of France
Roberto Strozzi (died 1566), married Maddalena di Pierfrancesco de' Medici (Florence, c. 1523 - Rome, 14 April 1583), daughter of Pierfrancesco II de' Medici
Maria Strozzi, married Lorenzo Ridolfi
Leone Strozzi (15 October 1515 - 28 June 1554), condottiero and Knight of Malta
Giulio Strozzi (died 1537)
Vincenzo Strozzi (died Rome, c. 1537)
Alessandro Strozzi (died 1541)
Luigia Strozzi (died 1534), married Senator Luigi Capponi (patrician of Florence)
Maddalena Strozzi, married Count Flaminio dell'Anguillara
Lorenzo Strozzi (3 December 1513 - 14 December 1571), abbot and Cardinal

She died in 1528 from either miscarriage or childbirth complications of a stillborn child

Ancestry

References

Sources

1493 births
1528 deaths
Nobility from Florence
Clarice
16th-century Italian nobility
16th-century Italian women
Deaths in childbirth